Sundlaugin (the swimming pool) is a recording studio located near Álafoss in the town of Mosfellsbær in Iceland known for being the recording and rehearsal location of post-rock band Sigur Rós. The location was originally a swimming pool built in the 1930s which had been abandoned when Sigur Rós purchased it in 1999 and converted it and adjacent buildings into a studio.

The band originally intended to record their third album, entitled, in an abandoned NATO tracking base in the northernmost mountain in Iceland, but after inspection decided it was too impractical. Shortly after they found the abandoned pool lot in a rural neighborhood in  Mosfellsbær. They bought the lot and transformed it into a studio. In order to fit the massive mixing console into the building, part of the roof was opened up and the console was lowered with a crane.

Much of the band's photography and artwork is taken from the surrounding landscape, such as the art found on the first album recorded in the studio,.

The recording studio has also been used for recording, mixing and mastering (usually assisted by the studio's sound engineer Birgir Jón "Biggi" Birgisson) by a wide group of mainly Icelandic artists and bands, including:

 Agent Fresco
 The Album Leaf
 Alcest
 amiina
 Amusement Parks on Fire
 Andŕum
 Beneath
 Benni Hemm Hemm
 Bubbi Morthens
 Flying Hórses
 For a Minor Reflection
 Jakobínarína
 Julianna Barwick
 Kira Kira
 Langi Seli og Skuggarnir 
 Mammút 
 Mugison
 Múm 
 Ólöf Arnalds
 Pétur Ben 
 Retro Stefson
 Seabear
 Self Defense Family
 Sin Fang
 Ske
 Slowblow
 Steindór Andersen
 Stórsveit Nix Noltes
 Trevor Geir

As of 2020, Sundlaugin is owned by Sigur Rós keyboardist Kjartan Sveinsson.

References

Sigur Rós
Recording studios in Iceland